San José del Cabo (Saint Joseph of the Cape) is a city located in southern Baja California Sur state, Mexico. The city has a population of 136,285 as of the 2020 Census. San José del Cabo together with Cabo San Lucas are known as Los Cabos. Together they form a metropolitan area of 351,111 inhabitants.

The two cities are served by Los Cabos International Airport.

Population
In the 2015 census, it had a population of 93,069. Together with neighboring Cabo San Lucas, it forms a major tourist destination for travelers, with over 900,000 hotel guests in 2011.

The Mission San José del Cabo was founded in 1730 on the west bank of the nearby Río San José. For more than 250 years it has furnished drinking and irrigation water for the town of San Jose del Cabo, beginning as a source of fresh water for Spanish galleons traveling back from the Philippines. The river used to flow above ground until the beginning of the 20th century due to anthropogenic causes. A one km long sand bar separates the estuary from what early Spanish explorers, including Sebastian Vizcaino, called the Bahía de San Bernabé or Bay of San Bernabé and now San José del Cabo Bay.

San José del Cabo is one of two places where the rare and nearly extinct rice rat Oryzomys peninsulae has been found.

Climate
Overall, however, rainfall is some of the most erratic anywhere in the world due to this influence, and many years pass by without significant rainfalls at all.

Demographics

See also

Battle of San José del Cabo
Siege of San José del Cabo
Los Cabos Municipality
Misión Estero de las Palmas de San José del Cabo Añuití

References

Populated places in Baja California Sur
Los Cabos Municipality (Baja California Sur)
Beaches of Baja California Sur
Municipality seats in Baja California Sur